Caifanes MTV Unplugged is a live album by Mexican Rock band Caifanes released in 1994 as part of the MTV Unplugged series in which bands play their music in acoustic form for the MTV music channel. Caifanes plays its music, being the first Mexican band and the second Spanish speaking band (after Los Fabulosos Cadillacs), by participating in this series during the month of October in 1994.

Track listing

 Los Dioses Ocultos 
 El Animal 
 La Célula Que Explota 
 Nubes 
 Hasta Morir 
 Aquí No Es Así 
 Aviéntame
 Miedo
 Quisiera Ser Alcohol 
 Ayer Me Dijo un Ave 
 Afuera 
 La Negra Tomasa

Curiosities

Two of the songs from this MTV Unplugged were included in the compilation album La Historia (Caifanes album).

 Aviéntame
 Miedo

During the guitar solo from the song 'Afuera', one of the strings from Alejandro Marcovich's guitar breaks, so he improvises a little his original solo towards the end of the song.

References

External links
Last FM

Caifanes live albums
1994 live albums
Spanish-language live albums